The trade policy of Japan related to Japan's approach to import and export with other countries.

Export policies

For many years, export promotion was a large issue in Japanese government policy. Government officials recognized that Japan needed to import to grow and develop, and it needed to generate exports to pay for those imports. After 1945, Japan had difficulty exporting enough to pay for its imports until the mid-1960s, and resulting deficits were the justification for export promotion programs and import restrictions.

The belief in the need to promote exports is early strong and part of Japan's self-image as a "processing nation." A processing nation must import raw materials but is able to pay for the imports by adding value to them and exporting some of the output. Nations grow stronger economically by moving up the industrial ladder to produce products with greater value added to the basic inputs. Rather than letting markets accomplish this movement on their own, the Japanese government felt the economy should be guided in this direction through industrial policy.

Japan's methods of promoting exports has taken two paths. The first was to develop world-class industries that can initially substitute for imports and then compete in international markets. The second was to provide incentives for firms to export.

During the first two decades after World War II, export incentives took the form of a combination of tax relief and government assistance to build export industries. After joining the International Monetary Fund (IMF) in 1964, however, Japan had to drop its major export incentive — the total exemption of export income from taxes — to comply with IMF procedures. It did maintain into the 1970s, however, special tax treatment of costs for market development and export promotion.

Once chronic trade deficits came to an end in the mid-1960s, the need for export promotion policies diminished. Virtually all export tax incentives were eliminated over the course of the 1970s. Even JETRO, whose initial function is to assist smaller firms with overseas marketing, saw its role shift toward import promotion and other activities. In the 1980s, Japan continued to use industrial policy to promote the growth of new, more sophisticated industries, but direct export promotion measures were no longer part of the policy package.

The 1970s and 1980s saw the emergence of policies to restrain exports in certain industries. The great success of some Japanese export industries created a backlash in other countries, either because of their success per se or because of allegations of unfair competitive practices. Under General Agreement on Tariffs and Trade (GATT) guidelines, nations have been reluctant to raise tariffs or impose import quotas. Quotas violate the guidelines, and raising tariffs goes against the general trend among industrial nations. Instead, they have resorted to convincing the exporting country to "voluntarily" restrain exports of the offending product. In the 1980s, Japan was quite willing to carry out such export restraints. Among Japan's exports to the United States, steel, color television sets, and automobiles all were subject to such restraints at various times.

Import policies

Postwar era
Japan began the postwar period with heavy import barriers. Virtually all products were subject to government quotas, many faced high tariffs, and the Ministry of International Trade and Industry had authority over the allocation of the foreign exchange that companies needed to pay for any import. These policies were justified at the time by the weakened position of Japanese industry and the country's chronic trade deficits.

By the late 1950s, Japan's international trade had regained its prewar level, and its balance of payments displayed sufficient strength for its rigid protectionism to be increasingly difficult to justify. The IMF and GATT strongly pressured Japan to free its commerce and international payments system. Beginning in the 1960s, the government adopted a policy of gradual trade liberalization, easing import quotas, reducing tariff rates, freeing transactions in foreign exchange, and admitting foreign capital into Japanese industries, which continued through the 1980s.

The main impetus for change throughout has been international obligation, that is, response to foreign, rather than domestic, pressure. The result has been a prolonged, reluctant process of reducing barriers, which has frustrated many of Japan's trading partners.

Japan has been a participant in the major rounds of tariffcutting negotiations under the GATT framework — the Kennedy Round completed in 1967, the Tokyo Round completed in 1979, and the Uruguay Round completed in 1993. As a result of these agreements, tariffs in Japan fell to a low level on average. Upon complete implementation of the Tokyo Round agreement, Japan had the lowest average tariff level among industrial countries—2.5 percent, compared with 4.2 percent for the United States and 4.6 percent for the European Union (known as the European Community before November 1993).

1980s
Japan's quotas also dropped. From 490 items under quota in 1962, Japan had only twenty-seven items under quota in the mid-1980s, and that number dropped again late in the decade to twenty-two with further agreements scheduled to come into effect in the early 1990s, which would reduce the number again. But those products still under quota proved to be highly visible and were the object of complaints by exporting countries. The reduction of controlled items in the late 1980s resulted from Japan's loss of a GATT case brought by the United States concerning import restrictions on twelve agricultural products. In addition, heavy pressure from the United States led to an agreement that Japan would end import quotas on beef and citrus fruit in 1991. The one restricted product that continues to prompt objections from other countries is rice, imports of which until 1994 were prohibited. Rice has traditionally been the mainstay of the Japanese diet, and farm organizations played upon the deep cultural importance as a reason for prohibiting imports. Farm organizations also had a disproportionate political voice because of the shift of the population to the cities without any significant redistricting for seats in the Diet. Despite such entrenched political and cultural opposition, foreign rice gradually found its way into Japanese markets and even on to the emperor's dining table by 1994.

Despite Japan's rather good record on tariffs and quotas, it continued to be the target of complaints and pressure from its trading partners during the 1980s. Many complaints revolved around non-tariff barriers other than quotas — standards, testing procedures, government procurement, and other policy that could be used to restrain imports. These barriers, by their very nature, were often difficult to document, but complaints were frequent.

In 1984 the United States government initiated intensive talks with Japan on four product areas: forest products, telecommunications equipment and services, electronics, and pharmaceuticals and medical equipment. The Market Oriented Sector Selective (MOSS) talks were aimed at routing out all overt and informal barriers to imports in these areas. The negotiations lasted throughout 1985 and achieved modest success.

Supporting the view that Japanese markets remained difficult to penetrate, statistics showed that the level of manufactured imports in Japan as a share of the gross national product (GNP) was still far below the level in other developed countries during the 1980s. Frustration with the modest results of the MOSS process and similar factors led to provisions in the Omnibus Trade and Competitiveness Act of 1988 aimed at Japan. Under the "Super 301" provision, nations were to be named as unfair trading partners and specific products chosen for negotiation, as appropriate, with retaliation against the exports of these nations should negotiations fail to provide satisfactory results. Japan was named an unfair trading nation in 1989, and negotiations began on forest products, supercomputers, and telecommunications satellites.

By the end of the 1980s, however, some internally generated changes in import policy appeared to be under way in Japan. The rapid appreciation of the yen after 1985, which made imports more attractive, stimulated a domestic debate over nontariff barriers and other structural features of the economy impeding imports. Greater openness in policies and structures began to be sought in response to domestic pressures rather than in response to foreign pressure and international obligation.

External pressure for change also increased when the United States initiated a series of bilateral talks in 1989 parallel to negotiations under the "Super 301" provision. These new talks, known as the Structural Impediments Initiative, focused on structural features in Japan that seemed to impede imports in ways outside the normal scope of trade negotiations. Issues raised in the Structural Impediments Initiative, and by the Japanese themselves in domestic discussions, included the distribution system (in which manufacturers continued to have unusually strong control over wholesalers and retailers handling their products, inhibiting newcomers, especially foreign ones) and investment behavior that made it very difficult for foreign firms to acquire Japanese firms (such as that of the management of Koito Mfg. in denying board representation to T. Boone Pickens despite the fact that he had become the majority stockholder). These discussions highlighted some of the fundamental differences in the Japanese and United States economies.

Pressure to raise imports peaked in the late 1980s and early 1990s when the US pushed for quantitative targets for more imports in semiconductors, autos and auto parts. Jagdish Bhagwati (1988) calls these policies Voluntary Import Expansion (VIE) policies. In general, these policies tended to have negative welfare effects (and usually higher prices) in theory (Greaney, 1996) and in practice (Dick, 1995) or little effect at all (Parsons, 2002).

1990s to 2010
The collapse of the Japanese asset price bubble in the early 1990s and the following Lost Decade helped to open inbound trade. Discount markets opened the distribution chains, and several companies turned to foreign trade and investment to avoid losses and even bankruptcy. Products of Japanese companies that were manufactured in South-Asian countries were reimported at lower prices. The Japanese consumer also changed: Economic problems forced many Japanese to look for cheap prices first and care about national pride or superior quality later.

TPP Questions
In a diet speech of January 24, 2011, former prime minister Kan proclaimed that Japan would and should participate to the Trans-Pacific Strategic Economic Partnership. This proclamation raised an unusual controversy among Japanese, not only those policy people and media people, but among wide range of people in industry, agriculture, medicine and even writers. The controversy continued until prime minister Noda decided that the Government would start to negotiate with TPP countries on November 11, 2011. Mass media stopped covering the question on a daily basis but the opposition movements continued. Recently Mr. Noda revealed that he will not discuss TPP question at the coming talk with U.S. President Obama on 
April 30.

History

Exports
The Potsdam Declaration of 1945, declared that Japan would surrender all of its armed forces, and the Japanese military would be under the control of the Supreme Commander for the Allied Powers. In theory, the economy would be left to the management of the Japanese government. In practice however, the economy was largely influenced by the Occupation policies of the Allied Powers. Initially, the United States' main goal for post-war Japan was to demilitarize the Japanese economy. During the early phase of post-war Japan, private foreign trade had been prohibited by SCAP, and all trade was state conducted. There were restrictions to heavy industry outputs such as steel, aluminium, and copper; which limited Japan's shipbuilding, machinery, and chemical industries. Imports were only allowed when they were judged to be indispensable to the sustenance of the Japanese economy. However, the SCAP policies to Japanese industry would be quickly reversed due to Cold War politics. On August 15, 1947, the United States' government announced a policy that relaxed trade restrictions to Japan; reopening private exports. Trade was still heavily regulated; as a foreign buyer would need to submit a purchase and sale agreement, and the Japanese exporter also needed to file an application to the Board of Trade, which would then be forwarded to SCAP for final approval.

Japanese exports grew rapidly in the 1960s and 1970s, but growth slowed considerably during the 1980s. Over these decades, both the composition and the reputation of products from Japan changed profoundly.

Because of the success of certain exports, Japan is often viewed as a heavily export-dependent nation. As an example, just under half of all automobiles produced in Japan were exported.

The growth of Japanese exports during the 1960s and 1970s was truly phenomenal. Beginning in 1960 at US$4.1 billion, merchandise exports grew at an average annual rate of 16.9% in the 1960s and at an average annual rate of 21% in the 1970s. From 1981 to 1988, however, export growth averaged 11.3% per year, about one-half the level of the 1970s. By 1990 merchandise exports reached US$286.9 billion.

The growth in exports can be viewed in terms of both pull and push factors. The pull came from increasing demand for Japanese products as the United States and other foreign markets grew and as trade barriers in major market countries were reduced. Another pull factor was the price competitiveness of Japanese products. From 1960 to 1970, Japan's export price index increased by only 4%, reflecting the high rate of productivity growth in the manufacturing industries producing export products. Inflation was higher in the 1970s, but export prices were still only 45% higher in 1980 than in 1970 (growing at an average annual rate of less than 4%), considerably lower than world inflation. The 1980s began with another short burst of inflation because of oil price increases in 1979, but by 1988 Japanese export prices were actually 23% lower than in 1980, offsetting much of the price increase of the 1980s. This record enhanced the international price competitiveness of Japanese products.

During the 1950s, Japanese export products had a reputation for poor quality. However, this image changed dramatically during the 1970s. Japanese steel, ships, watches, television receivers, automobiles, semiconductors, and many other goods developed a reputation for being manufactured to high standards and under strict quality control. The Japanese were the acknowledged world leaders for quality and design in the 1980s for some of these products. This rise in product quality also increased demand for Japanese exports.

The push behind Japan's exports came from manufacturers. Many recognized that to reach efficient levels of production they needed to adopt a global approach. Manufacturers concentrated on the domestic market (often protected from foreign products) until they reached internationally competitive levels and domestic markets were saturated. Often helped by the large general trading companies, manufacturers aggressively attacked foreign markets when they felt able to compete globally. This push factor partially accounted for the extraordinarily high level of export growth in the 1970s, when the domestic economy slowed; increasing exports was a way for manufacturers to continue expanding despite the more sluggish domestic market. Japanese manufacturers were part of larger conglomerates, the zaibatsu, which provided financing of activities. Thus, they could concentrate on gaining high market shares, without the need to achieve high profits in the process.

Exports included a wide variety of products, virtually all of which were processed to some degree. After the war, the composition of exports shifted through technological progression. Primary products, light manufactures, and crude items, which predominated during the 1950s, were gradually eclipsed by heavy industrial goods, complex machinery and equipment, and consumer durables, which required large capital investments and advanced technology to produce. This process was illustrated vividly in the case of textiles, which composed more than 30% of Japanese exports in 1960, but less than 3% by 1988. Iron and steel products, which had grown rapidly in the 1960s to become nearly 15% of exports by 1970, declined to less than 6% of exports by 1988. Over the same period, however, exports of motor vehicles rose from under 2% to over 18% of the total. In 1991 Japan's major exports were motor vehicles, office machinery, scientific and optical equipment, and semiconductors and other electronic components.

After the Fukushima Nuclear Disaster in 2011 concerns were expressed about the safety of Japanese food exports. Factory output was also badly affected by power supply problems. Japanese exports have also been effected by the ongoing trade war between China and the United States and in January 2019 Japan reported an expected decline in exports. Sales of electronics and equipment used to make semiconductors have been effected as China has slowed purchases due to the combined factors of the trade war and also declining demand for smart phones.

Imports
During the 1960s and 1970s, imports grew in tandem with exports, at an average annual rate of 15.4% during the 1960s and 22.2% during the 1970s. In a sense, import growth over much of this period was constrained by exports, because exports generated the foreign exchange to purchase the imports. During the 1980s, however, import growth lagged far behind exports, at an average annual rate of only 2.9% from 1981 to 1988. This low level of import growth led to the large trade surpluses that emerged in the 1980s.

In general, Japan has not imported an unusually large amount as a share of its GNP, but it has been highly dependent on imports for a variety of critical raw materials. Japan has by no means been the only industrialized nation dependent on imported raw materials, but it has depended on imports for a wider variety of materials, and often for a higher share of its needs for these materials. The country imported, for example, 50% of its caloric intake of food and about 30% of the total value of food consumed in the late 1980s. It also depended on imports for about 85% of its total energy needs (including all of its petroleum and 89% of its coal) and nearly all of its iron, copper, lead, and nickel.

The long-term growth in imports was facilitated by several major factors. The most important was general growth in the Japanese economy and income levels. Rising real incomes increased demand for imports, both those consumed directly and those entering into production. Another factor was the shift in the economy toward greater reliance on imported raw materials. Primary energy sources in the late 1940s, for example, were domestic coal and charcoal. The shift to imported oil and coal as major energy sources did not come until the late 1950s and 1960s. The small size and poor quality of many of the mineral deposits in Japan, combined with innovations in ocean transportation, such as bulk ore carriers, meant that as the economy grew, demand outstripped domestic supply and cheaper imports were utilized.

The price of imports was also a factor in their growth. In 1973 Japan's import price index was at essentially the same level as in 1955, partly because of the appreciation of the yen after 1971, which reduced the yen price of imports, but also because of the reduced costs of ocean shipping and stable prices for food and raw materials. For the rest of the 1970s, however, import prices skyrocketed, climbing 219% from 1973 to 1980. This dramatic price rise, especially for petroleum but by no means confined to it, was responsible for the rapid growth of the dollar value of imports during the 1970s, despite the slower growth of the economy. During the 1980s, import prices fell again, especially for petroleum, dropping by 44% from 1980 to 1988. Reflecting these price movements, the dollar value of petroleum imports rose from about US$2.8 billion in 1970 to nearly US$58 billion in 1980, and then fell a low of US$26 billion in 1988 before making a slight recovery to US$41 billion in 1990.

A third factor affecting imports was trade liberalization. Reduced tariff rates and a weakening of other overt trade barriers meant that imports should have been able to compete more fully in Japan's markets. The extent to which this was true, however, was subject to much debate among analysts. The share of manufactured imports in GNP changed very little from 1970 to 1985, suggesting that falling import barriers had little impact on the propensity to purchase foreign products. Falling trade barriers might become more significant in the 1990s as liberalization continues.

Yet another factor determining import levels was the exchange rate. After the ending of the Bretton Woods System in 1971, the yen appreciated against the United States dollar and other currencies. The appreciation of the yen made imports less expensive to Japan, but it had a complex effect on total imports. Demand for raw material imports was not affected much by price changes (at least in the short run). Demand for manufactured goods, however, was more responsive to price changes. Much of the rapid increase in imports of manufactures after 1985, when the yen began to appreciate rapidly, can be attributed to this exchange-rate effect.

All factors combined led to the rapid growth of imports in the 1960s and 1970s and their very slow growth in the 1980s. Rapid economic growth combined with stable import prices and the shift toward imported raw materials brought high import growth in the 1960s. The big jump in raw material prices in the 1970s kept import growth high despite lower economic growth. In the 1980s, falling raw material prices, a relatively weak yen, and continued modest economic growth kept import growth low in the first half of the decade. Import growth finally accelerated in the second half of the 1980s, when raw material prices stopped falling and as the rise in the value of the yen encouraged manufactured imports.

Japan imported a wide range of products, although energy sources, raw materials, and food were the major items. Mineral fuels, for example, rose from under 17% of all imports in 1960 to a high of nearly 50% in 1980. They had declined to under 21% by 1988. A small increase was experienced by 1991 when mineral fuel imports increased to 23%. These shifts show the enormous impact of price changes on imports. Swings in imports of other raw materials were far less dramatic, and many declined over time as a share of total imports. Metal ores and scrap, for example, declined steadily from 15% in 1960 to less than 5% in 1988 and less than 4% in 1991, reflecting the changing structure of the economy, which moved away from basic metal manufactures to higher value-added industries. Textile materials also dropped from 17% of total imports in 1960 to just under 2% in 1988 and just over 1% in 1991, as the textile industry became less important and imports of finished textiles increased. Foodstuffs, however, were relatively steady as a share of imports, rising from just over 12% in 1960 to 15.5% in 1988. By 1991 a slight decline, 14.5%, was experienced.

Manufactured goods—chemicals, machinery and equipment, and miscellaneous commodities—gained as a share of imports, but the variation among them was considerable. Manufactures were about 22% of total imports in 1960, remained at just under 23% in 1980, and then expanded to 49% by 1988. By 1991 they were just over 45%. Imports of textiles, nonferrous metals, and iron and steel products all showed significant gains, for the same reasons that the raw material imports to produce them had declined. However, chemical and machinery and equipment imports showed little increase in share until after 1985.

The heavy dependency on raw materials that characterized Japan until the mid-1980s reflected both their absence in Japan and the process of import substitution industrialization, in which Japan favored domestic industries over imports. The desire to restrict manufactured imports was intensified by the knowledge that the nation needed strong manufacturing industries to generate exports to pay for needed raw material imports. Only with the appreciation of the yen after 1985, and the drop in petroleum and other raw material prices, did this sense of vulnerability ease. These trends were reflected in the rising share of manufactures in imports in the late 1980s.

Balance of merchandise trade
Between 1960 and 1964, Japan incurred annual trade deficits (based on a customs clearance for imports) ranging from US$400 million to US$1.6 billion. The era of chronic trade deficit ended in 1965, and by 1969, with a positive balance of almost US$1 billion, Japan was widely regarded as a surplus trading nation. In 1971 the surplus reached US$4.3 billion, and its rapid increase was a main factor behind the United States decision to devalue the dollar and pressure Japan to revalue the yen—events that led quickly to the end of the Bretton Woods System of fixed exchange rates. By 1972 Japan's surplus had climbed to US$5.1 billion, despite the reevaluation of the yen in 1971.

The jump in prices of petroleum and other raw materials during 1973 plunged the balance of trade into deficit, and in 1974 the deficit reached US$6.6 billion. With strong export growth, however, this was reversed to a surplus of US$2.4 billion in 1976. The surplus reached a record US$18.2 billion in 1978, promoting considerable tension between the United States and Japan.

In 1979 petroleum prices jumped again, and Japan's trade balance again turned to deficit, reaching US$10.7 billion in 1980. Once again, rapid export growth and stagnant imports returned Japan quickly to surplus by 1981. For the next five years, Japan's trade surplus grew explosively, to a peak of US$82.7 billion in 1986. This unprecedented trade surplus resulted from the moderate annual rise in exports and the drop in imports noted earlier. Underlying these trade developments was the weakness of the yen against other currencies, which enhanced export price competitiveness and dampened import demand.

After 1986 the dollar value of Japan's trade surplus declined, to US$77.6 billion in 1988. This decline came as the yen finally appreciated strongly against the dollar (beginning in 1985) and as a rapid rise in manufactured imports began to offset the large drop in the value of raw material imports. By 1990 the trade surplus had declined to US$52.1 billion.

Underlying trends throughout the 1970s and 1980s were the fundamental strength of Japan's export sector. Under the fixed exchange rates of the 1960s, exports became progressively more competitive on world markets, lifting the country out of the persistent trade deficits that had continued into the early years of the decade. During the 1970s, rapid export expansion extricated the country from the deficits immediately following the two oil price shocks of 1973 and 1979. Continuing export strength then drove the nation to the extraordinary trade surpluses of the 1980s, as the temporary burden of costly oil imports waned.

Japan's fundamental strength in world markets required its fear of vulnerability and opposition to manufactured imports to be reassessed. In the early 1980s, fear of vulnerability remained strong and fed the continuation of policies and behavior that kept manufactured imports unusually low compared with those of the other industrial nations. Only with the large decline in raw material prices and the explosion of trade surpluses did policies and behavior begin to change.

After more than 30 years had trade surpluses, in 2011 the trade deficit came to 2.49 trillion yen ($32 billion), but the previous trade deficit came in 1980 was still a record by 2.6 trillion yen.

See also

 Economic relations of Japan
 Economy of Japan
 Economy of China

References

  - Japan

Further reading

 Bhagwati, J. (1988) Protectionism, The MIT Press, Cambridge, Massachusetts 
 Dick, A. (1995) Industrial Policy and Semiconductors: Missing the Target, AEI Press, Washington, D.C. 
 Greaney, T. (1996) "Import Now! An Analysis of Market-share Voluntary Import Expansions (VIEs), Journal of International Economics 40 149-163.
 Parsons, C. (2002) "Did the US-Japan Semiconductor Trade Agreement Have any Impact?" Asian Economic Journal 16(1) 37-51.DOI: 10.1111/1467-8381.00141

External links
Japanese-US Economic Relations from the Dean Peter Krogh Foreign Affairs Digital Archives

 
Foreign relations of Japan
Economy of Japan
Public policy in Japan
Japan